Cibitung-Cilincing Toll Road is a  toll road which extends from Cibitung, West Java, to Cilincing, Jakarta in Indonesia. This is one of the toll roads which are part of the Jakarta Outer Ring Road 2. This toll road is expected to reduce the burden of freight and vehicle transportation on the Jakarta–Cikampek Toll Road that crosses the Cawang area.

History
The toll road consists of four sections. Construction of this toll road has been delayed by eight years due to land acquisition problems. The toll road was expected to be operational by 2019. The first section of the toll road has been operating since 30 July 2021, followed by the inaugurations of sections 2 and 3 on 20 September 2022.

Sections

Exits

See also

Trans-Java toll road

References

External links
Cibitung Tanjung Priok Port Tollways website

Toll roads in Indonesia
Transport in Jakarta
Transport in West Java